V.K.N. Kandigai is a small village in the Tiruvallur district of Tamil Nadu, India.

References 

Villages in Tiruvallur district